The Jenkins Cavaliers were a minor league baseball team based in Jenkins, Kentucky. From 1948 to 1951, Jenkins played exclusively as members of the Class D level Mountain States League. The Cavaliers hosted home minor league games at the Jenkins Athletic Field.

History
The 1948 Jenkins Cavaliers began minor league play as members of the Class D level Mountain States League. The "Cavaliers" was also the moniker of the local Jenkins High School and remains so today. The Cavaliers joined fellow league members, the Harlan Smokies, Hazard Bombers, Morristown Red Sox, Newport Canners and Pennington Gap Miners in the six–team league. 

In their first season of play in 1948, the Jenkins Cavaliers finished with a record of 35–78 placing 6th and last in the league standings. Managed by Ray Russell, Jack Bell and Brenton Mays, Jenkins finished 33.5 games behind 1st place Morristown. The Cavaliers began play at Jenkins Athletic Field.

The 1949 Jenkins Cavaliers continued play as members of the Mountain States League and qualified for the playoffs. The Cavaliers finished in 4th place as the Big Stone Gap Rebels and Middlesboro Athletics joined the Mountain States League to form an eight–team league. The 1949 Jenkins Cavaliers finished with a 63–61 record under manager Joe Vitter, ending the regular 20.0 games behind the 1st place Harlan Smokies. In the playoffs, Jenkins lost in 1st round to the Morristown Red Sox 3 games to 2.>

In 1950, the Jenkins Cavaliers finished with a 58–66 record placing 5th in the Mountain States League regular season standings. Playing under managers Bob Bowman, Wayne Stewart and Bill Scopetone, Jenkins finished 22.5 games behind the 1st place Harlan Smokies in the regular season standings.

Jenkins played their final season in 1951. The Cavaliers finished with a 24–101 record, placing a distant 8th in the regular season under managers James Grigg and Tom McBride. Finishing 68.5 games behind the Hazard Bombers in the regular season standings, the Cavaliers scored 571 runs while surrendering 1154 runs, both worst in the Mountain States League. After the 1951 season, both the Jenkins and Pennington Gap franchises folded and the Mountain States League reduced to six teams in 1952. Jenkins has not hosted another minor league team.

The ballpark
The Jenkins Cavaliers teams hosted home minor league games at Jenkins Athletic Field. Built in 1947, the ballpark had a capacity of 2,000 and was also used by Jenkins High School athletic teams. Jenkins Athletic Field was located on Main Street across from Jenkins High School in Jenkins, Kentucky.

Timeline

Year–by–year records

Notable alumni

Bob Bowman (1950, MGR)
Tom McBride (1950), (1951, MGR)
Dom Zanni (1951)

See also
Jenkins Cavaliers players

References

External link
Jenkins - Baseball Reference

Mountain States League (1948–1954) teams
Defunct baseball teams in Kentucky
Baseball teams established in 1948
Baseball teams disestablished in 1951
Defunct Mountain States League (1948–1954) teams
Jenkins, Kentucky